Elinor Carucci (born June 11, 1971) is an Israeli-American Fine Art Photographer of a North-African and Bukhari descent. She is based in New York City.

Carucci has published four monographs to date; Closer (2002), Diary of a Dancer (2005), Mother (2013) and Midlife (2019). While maintaining a photography practice, Carucci has also taught at Harvard University Princeton University and currently teaches at the School of Visual Arts MFA program in New York.

In 2001, she was awarded the ICP Infinity Award, in 2010 a Guggenheim Fellowship and in 2010 a New York Foundation for the Arts grant. Carucci's work has been included in solo and group shows at The Photographers' Gallery and the Gagosian Gallery in London and Museum of Modern Art, Museum of Contemporary Photography and Brooklyn Museum in the US.

Life
Carucci graduated in 1989 from Jerusalem Academy of Music and Dance where she majored in music. She then served in the Israeli Army for two years from 1989 to 1991. After serving she graduated in 1995 from Bezalel Academy of Arts and Design with a degree in photography and moved to New York City that same year, where she now lives with her husband, Eran Bendheim, and their two children.

She currently teaches at the graduate program of photography at School of Visual Arts while continuing her personal fine art photography projects. Currently, she is working on a project photographing her teenage children and their social cycles.

Her work has appeared in The New York Times Magazine, The New Yorker, New York Magazine, W, Aperture, ARTnews among many other publications.

As put in a B&H Studio Visit with Carucci, her work consistently dives into the personal, yet always with the goal of finding universal meaning. Her photographs reflect qualities of the snapshot home-photo-album aesthetic, yet also that of the theatrically staged image. In this, she melts boundaries between the two extremes of Nan Goldin and Sally Mann, two of her greatest inspirations, as described in ARTnews article published in November 2006 by Edwynn Houk and in the B&H Studio Visit with Carucci.

Major works

Closer

Carucci's first monograph, Closer, contains her earlier work focusing on immediate family and her closest relationships. A Time Lightbox article from 2013 summarizes the work as chronicling "her tumultuous relationship with her husband and parents through incidents of infidelity (hers) too much dope (her husband’s) and her parents fractious relationship and eventual divorce. The mood was gentle, though, with plenty of high notes; the everyday ebb and flow of relationships were lovingly and lavishly documented, while the larger narratives played out in the background."

Diary of a Dancer

Published in her second monograph, Diary of a Dancer (2005), documents Carucci's experience as a professional Middle-Eastern belly dancer entertaining at events like weddings and bar/bat mitzvahs in the five boroughs of New York. It proved difficult for her to dance and take photographs herself, so she often had the help of husband Eran Bendheim. Images in this work reflect Carucci applying makeup and preparing for jobs in dismal looking bathrooms and on subway rides, snapshots of her dancing and of the people she was entertaining.

Mother

Carucci's third monograph, Mother (2013), examines the world of her own motherhood. Beginning during the pregnancy of her twins and ending when they turn eight years old, she explores the realities of motherhood, to its layered and complex moments, the joys and the pains, the beautiful and the ugly, the love and the dysfunctions. Mother also shed light to the deeply sensual and erotic connections between mother and child, all of the highs and lows in photographs reflecting the range of bliss to the raw, less attractive moments.

Crisis

This body of work (2001–2003) narrates a tumultuous time in her marriage to Eran Bendheim. Taking place at a time when they were working through her infidelity and mind-body induced physical pain and his marijuana usage, these photographs look straight into the darkness of post-arguments, as well as at their tender moments. Carucci has described how photographing this process actually brought them closer together, as they ultimately demonstrated to each other in the taking of these photographs that their love for one another is held above all else. Photographing was a way of reconnecting.

Midlife

Midlife (2011-2019) chronicles the years of middle of life, a time that is overlooked by our culture and society, especially in women's life.

Publications
 Closer. San Francisco: Chronicle, 2002. .
 Chronicle, 2009.  . Second edition. With a foreword by Susan Kismaric. 80 photographs.
 Diary of a Dancer. SteidlMack, 2005. .
 Mother. Prestel, 2013. .
Midlife. Monacelli Press, 2019,  ISBN 978-1-58093-529-6

Solo exhibitions 

 1996: National Arts Club, New York
 1996: Princeton University, Visual Arts Gallery, Princeton, NJ
 1999: The Photographers' Gallery, London
 1999: Fotografie Forum International, Frankfurt, Germany
 1999: Prague House of Photography, Prague
 2000: Haifa Museum of Art, Haifa, Israel
 2006: Moscow House of Photography, Moscow, Russia
 2006: Photography Gallery Vilnius: Union of Lithuanian Art Photographers, Lithuania
 2006: It's me, Herzlia Museum of Contemporary Art, Herzlia, Israel
 2007: Art Academy of Cincinnati, Convergys Gallery
 2007: Biennale de la Photographie, Luik, Belgium
 2010: My Children, Centre pour la Fotografie Contemporaine Le Bleu du Ciel, Lyon
 2011: Insight, FoMu, Antwerp, Belgium
 2014: Mother, Edwynn Houk Gallery, New York
2018: Getting Closer Becoming Mother; About Intimacy and Family 1993 -2012, Cortona on the move festival, main artist show, Cortona, Itally
2020: COVID, the gallery of the University of Central Missouri in Warrensburg, MO

Awards
 2000: “Thirty under 30 Young Photographers to Watch”, Photo District News
 2001: Winner, Best Young Photographer, Infinity Award, International Center of Photography
 2002: Guggenheim Fellowship, John Simon Guggenheim Memorial FoundationP
 2010: Artists' Fellowship, New York Foundation for the Arts (NYFA), New York

Collections
Carucci's work is held in the following permanent collections:
 Museum of Modern Art, New York
 Jewish Museum, New York
 International Center of Photography
 Brooklyn Museum of Arts
 Houston Museum of Fine Arts
 Ramat Gan Museum of Israeli Art, Ramat Gan, Israel
 Herzliya Museum of Contemporary Art
  Haifa Museum of Art
 Harwood Museum of Art, New Mexico
 Fotomuseum Antwerp, Antwerp

References

External links
 

American photographers
Israeli photographers
Living people
Bezalel Academy of Arts and Design alumni
1971 births
American women photographers
Israeli emigrants to the United States
21st-century American women